Umm as Sabaan is an islet in Bahrain. It lies off the north western corner of Bahrain Island, near Budaiya village, and east of Jidda Island, located in the Persian Gulf.

History
The island was privately owned by Sheikh Mohammed bin Salman Al Khalifa, uncle of the present King, Hamad bin Isa al Khalifa, and brother of Prime Minister Khalifa bin Salman Al Khalifa. Sheikh Mohammed renamed the island after himself as Al Mohammediya.

In the 1930s, the ruler of Bahrain lent the island as a gift to Max Thornburg, an American oil executive from Caltex. He cultivated the northern part of the island and lived with his wife there many months every year. In 1958, the Thornburgs returned the island.

Administration
The island belongs to Northern Governorate.

Image gallery

References

 Islands And Maritime Boundaries Of The Gulf 1798–1960, Archive Editions
 Personal diary of Charles D. Belgrave, British Advisor to the ruler of Bahrain, 1926 - 1957
 Article about politics of the islands, Abbas al Murshid

Islands of Bahrain
Private islands of Asia
Islands of the Persian Gulf
Populated places in the Northern Governorate, Bahrain